Paul Vincze  (15 August 1907 in Galgagyörk, Hungary – 5 March 1994 in Grasse, France) was a Jewish-Hungarian designer of coins and medal, and sculptor. Vincze's artistic works featured with the classical artistic style as shown on the coins he designed. His work was part of the sculpture event in the art competition at the 1948 Summer Olympics.

Education and Career 

He studied art at the Hungarian University of Arts and Design in Budapest, followed by private study under medalist Ede Talcs and in Rome from 1935–19377, supported by a traveling scholarship. He returned to Hungary after his studies, however he moved to England in 1938 due to Nazi persecution. He set up a studio in London, became a British citizen in 1948, and became an Art Workers’ Guild member and a fellow of RBS in 1961, until he retired in 1961.

Medals 

Vincze designed medals for both the government of Israel and Isnumat, a private Israeli mint.

Medals he did for the Israeli government include the 1966 Commemorative for Edmond and James de Rothschild and the 1967 Jubilee of the Balfour Declaration. For Isnumat, he did medals of the John F. Kennedy Memorial and the Visit of Pope Paul visit to the Holy Land.

His other includes the:

 300th Anniversary of the Jewish Resettlement in Great Britain (1956)
 medals of distinguished Jews such as Ben-Gurion, Lord Samuel, and Yehudi Menuhin, and

Coinage 

He designed a set of monetary coins of Malawi just before his death. Earlier he designed some of currency for the countries of Ghana, Libya, Nigeria, Malawi, and Guinea.

Awards 

He was recognized by several organizations and received the following awards:

 a Premio Especial at the International Exhibition, Madrid, 1951,
 a silver medal at the Paris Salon, 1964, and
 the first gold medal of the American Numismatic Association, 1966.

References 

1907 births
1994 deaths
Hungarian designers
Hungarian sculptors
Hungarian engravers
Olympic competitors in art competitions
Hungarian emigrants to the United Kingdom
20th-century engravers